The following highways are numbered 605:

Canada
 Alberta Highway 605
 New Brunswick Route 605
 Ontario Highway 605
Saskatchewan Highway 605

Costa Rica
 National Route 605

United States